Mudra or Múdra is a predominantly Czech–Slovak surname. In East-central Europe it may be derived from Czech moudrý or Slovak múdry, both with the meaning "wise." People with the name include:

 Bernd Mudra (born 1956), former German footballer
 Bruno von Mudra (1851–1931), Prussian officer
 Darrell Mudra (born 1929), former American football coach
 Hilda Múdra (born 1926), Austrian-born Slovak figure skating coach
 Jan Mudra (born 1990), Czech footballer
 Kristin Mudra (born 19??), German film director

See also
 Mudry

References

Czech-language surnames
Slovak-language surnames